Chantal van den Broek-Blaak (née Blaak; born 22 October 1989) is a Dutch road racing cyclist, who currently rides for UCI Women's WorldTeam . In 2017 she became world road race champion in Bergen, Norway.

Career

Junior career
Van den Broek-Blaak was the Dutch national junior time trial champion in 2006 and 2007.  She was European under-23 road race champion in 2009 and was also third in the Ronde van Drenthe race of the UCI Women's Road World Cup in that year.

Professional career

Van den Broek-Blaak began her professional career in 2008 with the Dutch  and remained with them until they disbanded at the end of 2012, after which she raced for the US team  for a year.

In 2014, she joined  and won her first UCI Women's Road World Cup race, the Open de Suède Vårgårda. 

She transferred to the  team for 2015, along with sponsors Specialized Bicycle Components and lululemon Athletica and teammate Evelyn Stevens. She won the 2015 Le Samyn des Dames.

2016 was her most successful season to date, yielding wins in Le Samyn des Dames, the Ronde van Drenthe, Gent–Wevelgem and the Holland Ladies Tour.

In 2017, van den Broek-Blaak became both Dutch national and world road race champion after she successfully broke away from an elite group of riders  from the finish. In the rainbow jersey, she won the Amstel Gold Race in 2018.

2019 saw Chantal Blaak win Omloop Het Nieuwsblad for the first time.

Personal life
In the 2019 off-season, Chantal Blaak married former cyclist Lars van den Broek.

Major results

2007
 1st  Time trial, National Junior Road Championships
 UCI Juniors World Championships
5th Time trial
10th Road race
2008
 6th Ronde van Gelderland
2009
 1st  Road race, UEC European Under-23 Road Championships
 2nd Road race, National Road Championships
 3rd Grand Prix de Dottignies
 3rd Ronde van Drenthe
 4th Omloop Het Nieuwsblad
 7th Omloop van Borsele
 8th Overall Holland Ladies Tour
 8th Trofeo Alfredo Binda-Comune di Cittiglio
 10th Ronde van Gelderland
2010
 2nd Holland Hills Classic
 5th Ronde van Drenthe
 6th Tour of Flanders for Women
 7th Open de Suède Vårgårda
 9th Road race, UEC European Under-23 Road Championships
2011
 1st Erondegemse Pijl
 3rd Road race, National Road Championships
 3rd Omloop Het Nieuwsblad
 4th GP de Plouay – Bretagne
 5th Overall Holland Ladies Tour
 6th Trofeo Alfredo Binda-Comune di Cittiglio
 8th Road race, UEC European Under-23 Road Championships
 10th Overall Ster Zeeuwsche Eilanden
1st Stage 2
2012
 2nd Ronde van Gelderland
 3rd  Team time trial, UCI Road World Championships
 4th EPZ Omloop van Borsele
 5th Holland Hills Classic
 5th 7-Dorpenomloop Aalburg
 8th Overall Energiewacht Tour
2013
 3rd Chrono Gatineau
 5th Trofeo Alfredo Binda-Comune di Cittiglio
 7th Omloop Het Nieuwsblad
 7th Grand Prix cycliste de Gatineau
 8th Overall Holland Ladies Tour
 9th Overall Belgium Tour
2014
 1st  Team time trial, UCI Road World Championships
 1st Drentse 8
 1st Open de Suède Vårgårda TTT
 1st Open de Suède Vårgårda
 1st Stage 5 Energiewacht Tour
 4th Ronde van Drenthe World Cup
 5th Novilon EDR Cup
 7th Ronde van Overijssel
2015
 1st Le Samyn des Dames
 1st RaboRonde Heerlen
 1st Stage 3 Emakumeen Euskal Bira
 2nd  Team time trial, UCI Road World Championships
 2nd Omloop van het Hageland
 3rd Time trial, National Road Championships
 3rd Crescent Women World Cup Vårgårda TTT
 4th Omloop Het Nieuwsblad
 4th Time trial, EPZ Omloop van Borsele
 5th Gooik–Geraardsbergen–Gooik
 6th Holland Hills Classic
 9th Tour of Flanders for Women
 9th Ronde van Overijssel
2016
 1st  Team time trial, UCI Road World Championships
 1st  Overall Holland Ladies Tour
1st Stage 2 (TTT)
 1st Le Samyn des Dames
 1st Ronde van Drenthe
 1st Gent–Wevelgem
 Crescent Vårgårda UCI Women's WorldTour
1st Team time trial
3rd Road race
 Energiewacht Tour
1st Stages 1 (TTT) & 2
 2nd Time trial, National Road Championships
 2nd Omloop Het Nieuwsblad
 3rd Tour of Flanders
 4th Madrid Challenge by La Vuelta
 5th Gooik–Geraardsbergen–Gooik
 6th Omloop van Borsele
2017
 UCI Road World Championships
1st  Road race
2nd  Team time trial
 1st  Road race, National Road Championships
 1st Crescent Vårgårda UCI Women's WorldTour TTT
 Healthy Ageing Tour
1st Stages 2 (TTT) & 4
 1st Stage 1 (TTT) Giro d'Italia Femminile
 2nd Omloop Het Nieuwsblad
 3rd Tour of Flanders for Women
 4th Trofeo Alfredo Binda-Comune di Cittiglio
 6th Overall Holland Ladies Tour
 8th Gent–Wevelgem
 9th Ronde van Drenthe
2018
 1st  Road race, National Road Championships
 1st Amstel Gold Race
 1st Postnord UCI WWT Vårgårda  TTT
 1st Stage 5 Holland Ladies Tour
 2nd  Team time trial, UCI Road World Championships
 2nd Overall Healthy Ageing Tour
1st Stages 3b (TTT) & 4
 2nd Trofeo Alfredo Binda-Comune di Cittiglio
 4th Strade Bianche
 5th Tour of Flanders for Women
2019
 1st Omloop Het Nieuwsblad
 2nd  Time trial, European Games
 2nd Ronde van Drenthe
 7th Tour of Flanders for Women
 10th Strade Bianche
2020
 1st Le Samyn des Dames
 1st Tour of Flanders for Women
 4th Road race, UEC European Road Championships
 4th Omloop Het Nieuwsblad
2021
 1st  Overall Holland Ladies Tour
 1st Strade Bianche
 1st Dwars door het Hageland
 1st Drentse Acht van Westerveld
 10th Paris–Roubaix
2022
 3rd Tour of Flanders for Women
 4th Trofeo Alfredo Binda-Comune di Cittiglio
 7th Omloop van het Hageland
 8th Paris–Roubaix

General classification results timeline

Classics results timeline

Major championship results timeline

References

External links

 
 
 
 
 
 
 

1989 births
Living people
Dutch female cyclists
Cyclists from Rotterdam
UCI Road World Champions (women)
UCI Road World Championships cyclists for the Netherlands
Cyclists at the 2015 European Games
Cyclists at the 2019 European Games
European Games medalists in cycling
European Games silver medalists for the Netherlands